Pablo is a British children's television series that premiered on CBeebies on 2 October 2017. It was created by Grainne McGuinness. The series follows the adventures of Pablo, a five year old autistic boy, and his imaginary anthropomorphized animal friends, the Book Animals, who go on adventures in Pablo's 'Art World'. It is a hybrid of live action sequences and 2D animation. The series features a voice cast and writing team who are all autistic.

It also broadcasts internationally, including on ABC Kids, RTÉjr, Nat Geo Kids, CBC Kids, Universal Kids, S4C and Netflix.

On 11 October 2021 it was announced a third series was in development, this season will be reworked, with Pablo now eight years old and with a redesigned art style, this season will also be for an older audience. On 1 April 2022 BBC Children's announced it had commissioned the third series.

Format

Series 1 & 2
A typical episode will begin in the real world, where Pablo will be engaging in some sort of activity. When encountering a problem or something he doesn't understand (like the loss of his own smell following a bath or the unusual way sandwiches are cut to be rectangular rather than triangular), the episode will transition into an animated 'art world', represented by Pablo's drawings. There, Pablo and the Book Animals will work together to solve whatever problem is at hand.

Series 3
The third series will send a now eight year old Pablo to primary school, a fascinating and at times overwhelming place. With the Book Animals at his side, Pablo will face new challenges and adventures.

Characters
 Pablo (played by William & Oliver Burns (live-action), voiced by Jake Williamson): the kind and playful protagonist. He loves to draw things in the Art World with his crayons.
 Mouse (voiced by Rachael Dickson): Mouse is very reliable, cute and organized, but she also hates loud sounds, she also talks in third person.
 Noa (voiced by Tony Finnegan): Noa is a dinosaur who's sensitive, but often doesn't know how to express his feelings. He "stims" by flapping his hands.
 Tang (voiced by Michael White): Tang is an orangutan who's the big, fun goofball of the group. He's always ready to do anything, but has problems reading social cues and isn't always very careful.
 Wren (voiced by Sumita Majumdar): Wren is gentle and loves to sing. Her words in her comforting voice always sooth others when they're in stress.
 Llama (voiced by Rosie King): Llama loves to skip around back and forth on her four legs as physical "stimming". She has echolalia.
 Draff (voiced by Scott Mulligan): a male giraffe who's the smartest of the group. Because of this, he's highly intelligent and precise. His most commonly used phrase is "in point of fact", as he loves explaining things; he represents Pablo's "infodumping" and his catchphrase "point of fact" is his verbal "stimming".
 Pablo's Mum (played by Rosie Barry): caring and attentive, she supports her son in any way she can. She mainly appears in the live action segments.

Episodes

Series 1 (2017–2018)

Series 2 (2019–2020)
Starting with "The New Sofa" on 7 October 2019, all the week's Pablo episodes would be made available on BBC iPlayer before their individual broadcast on CBeebies. From "Finger Prince" onwards, however, episodes would only go on iPlayer after their individual broadcast.

Specials
In addition to the main programme, a series of online shorts were produced in 2019. These include Going to School, Pack for School, Making Friends and Everything Pumpkin. In 2020, during the COVID-19 pandemic, an episode-length special was produced.

Awards
Pablo won Best Preschool Programme at the 2019 Broadcast Awards. It was nominated at the 2018 British Academy Children's Awards in Digital, was a Children’s Finalist at the 2018 Royal Television Society Awards and won the TORC Award for Excellence at the 2018 Celtic Media Festival.  It was nominated at the 2021 Irish Animation Awards for Best Animated Preschool Series and Best Writer for Preschool Animation (for Andrew Brenner, which it won).

Spin-off books
In April 2020, Ladybird began publishing a series of picture books, adapted from previous Pablo episodes. Sumita Majumdar and Andrew Brenner, who wrote on the series, oversaw these.
 Goodnight Pablo (based on "Goodnight Blues"), 
 Pablo and the Noisy Party (based on "The Party Present"), 
 Pablo Picks His Shoes (based on "Pick Us Pablo"), 
 Pablo’s Feelings (based on "Face Feelings"), 
 Pablo Goes Shopping (based on "The Super Place"), 
 Pablo at the Zoo, 

There will also be "Ladybird Readers" Level 1 books, designed to aid children develop their speech, reading and writing skills.
 Pablo Chooses His Shoes, 
 Are You Sad, Pablo?, 
 Pablo: Noisy Party,

Stage version
In 2019, it was announced Selladoor Worldwide is developing a stage musical adaptation of Pablo, in collaboration with Paper Owl Films. The original creative team will be involved.

References

External links
Official Pablo Page at CBeebies

2010s British children's television series
2020s British children's television series
2017 British television series debuts
BBC children's television shows
English-language television shows
British television series with live action and animation
British preschool education television series
Animated preschool education television series
2010s preschool education television series
2020s preschool education television series
Animated television series about children
Autism in television
CBeebies